The  is a museum in Toyama, Toyama.  It is one of Japan's many museums which are supported by a prefecture.

The museum, which opened in 1981, stands within Jōnan Park in central Toyama. It displays a permanent collection and also temporary exhibitions.

See also
 Prefectural museum

References

External links
Museum news 
About the museum 
About the museum 

Art museums and galleries in Japan
Museums in Toyama Prefecture
Art museums established in 1981
Museum of Modern Art, Toyama
Toyama (city)